The 2020 United States Senate election in Alabama was held on November 3, 2020, to elect a member of the United States Senate to represent the State of Alabama, concurrently with the 2020 U.S. presidential election, as well as other elections to the United States Senate in other states, elections to the United States House of Representatives, and various state and local elections.

Incumbent Democratic U.S. Senator Doug Jones, first elected in a 2017 special election, ran for a full term, facing Republican candidate Tommy Tuberville in the general election. Jones was one of two Democratic U.S. Senators running for re-election in 2020 in a state President Donald Trump carried in 2016, the other being Gary Peters in Michigan. Jones was widely considered the most vulnerable senator among those seeking re-election in 2020, due to the heavy Republican partisan balance in the state, with analysts predicting a Republican pickup; Jones's 2017 win was in part due to allegations against Republican nominee Roy Moore that he pursued sexual relations with teenagers as an adult during the special election.

As was predicted, Tuberville easily defeated Jones to flip the seat back to the GOP. Jones also suffered the largest margin of defeat for an incumbent U.S. Senator since Arkansas' Blanche Lincoln in 2010. Tommy Tuberville also received the highest percentage of the vote for any challenger since Joseph D. Tydings in 1964. Jones became the first Democratic senator to lose reelection in Alabama. Jones outperformed Biden in the state by about 5 points.

Democratic primary
The candidate filing deadline was November 8, 2019. Jones ran unopposed.

Candidates

Nominee
Doug Jones, incumbent U.S. senator

Declined
John Rogers, state representative
Randall Woodfin, mayor of Birmingham (endorsed Doug Jones)

Endorsements

Republican primary

Candidates

Nominee
Tommy Tuberville, former Auburn Tigers football head coach

Eliminated in runoff
Jeff Sessions, former United States attorney general and former U.S. senator from Alabama

Eliminated in primary
Stanley Adair, businessman
Bradley Byrne, incumbent U.S. representative for Alabama's 1st congressional district
Arnold Mooney, state representative
Roy Moore, former Chief justice of the Alabama Supreme Court, former candidate for Governor of Alabama in 2006 and 2010 and nominee for the U.S. Senate in 2017
Ruth Page Nelson, community activist

Withdrew
Marty Preston Hatley
John Merrill, Secretary of State of Alabama
Chase Anderson Romagnano, Republican candidate for Alabama's 1st congressional district and Florida's 1st congressional district in 2020
John Paul Serbin

Declined
Robert Aderholt, incumbent U.S. representative for Alabama's 4th congressional district
Will Ainsworth, Alabama lieutenant governor
Mo Brooks, incumbent U.S. representative for Alabama's 5th congressional district and candidate for U.S. Senate in 2017
Will Dismukes, state representative
Matt Gaetz, incumbent U.S. representative for Florida's 1st congressional district
Del Marsh, president pro tempore of the Alabama Senate
Arthur Orr, state senator (endorsed Bradley Byrne)
Martha Roby, incumbent U.S. representative for Alabama's 2nd congressional district
Heather Whitestone, former Miss America

Endorsements

First round

Polling

Primary results

Runoff
The runoff for the Republican Senate nomination was planned for March 31, 2020, but it was delayed until July 14 as a result of the COVID-19 pandemic.

Polling

with Bradley Byrne and Gary Palmer

with Bradley Byrne and Jeff Sessions

with Mo Brooks and Bradley Byrne

with Mo Brooks and Roy Moore

Results

Independents

Candidates

Withdrawn
Mike Parrish
Jarmal Sanders, reverend
Marcus Jejaun Williams

General election

Predictions

Endorsements

Polling

With Jeff Sessions

With Bradley Byrne

With Arnold Mooney

With Roy Moore

With Generic Republican

With Generic Opponent

with Generic Democrat and Generic Republican

Results

The result was a landslide victory for Tuberville. Tuberville's 20-point margin of victory is largely attributed to the presence of Donald Trump on the ballot, and Jones' votes against Brett Kavanaugh, Amy Coney Barrett, as well as his vote to convict Donald Trump in his first impeachment trial. Jones was widely considered the most vulnerable senator in 2020, and his victory in 2017 was largely attributed to allegations of child molestation against his opponent. While Jones was able to receive more raw votes than he did in 2017, Tuberville received nearly double the amount of votes Roy Moore did in 2017, largely due to the high Republican turnout. Jones did perform well in Jefferson County and Montgomery County, but still vastly underperformed his margins in 2017, while Tuberville easily won the rural areas, and successfully flipped many counties that went to Jones by significant margins.

Counties that flipped from Democratic to Republican 
The following counties voted for Doug Jones over Republican Roy Moore in the 2017 special election, but flipped to supporting Republican Tommy Tuberville in the 2020 election. In the 2017 election, Jones won several traditionally Republican counties while also driving up margins and turnout in traditionally Democratic counties: he added onto massive margins in Birmingham and Montgomery with narrow wins in the state's other, previously more conservative metropolitan areas, such as Huntsville, Mobile, and Tuscaloosa, alongside several other small counties encircling the Black Belt. Jones' win, though attributable to a spike in Democratic turnout and a decline in Republican turnout, was primarily reliant on allegations of child sexual abuse and pedophilia against Moore, resulting in several prominent Republicans rescinding their endorsements. With Tuberville lacking such controversies, the state swung hard into the Republican column in 2020, and he flipped 12 counties Jones won in 2017, listed below. Jones only won the 13 counties won by Joe Biden in the concurrent 2020 presidential election, and his victories in Jefferson County (Birmingham) and Montgomery County (Montgomery) were insufficient to overcome Tuberville's performance in the rest of the state.

 Barbour (largest city: Eufaula)
 Butler (largest city: Greenville)
 Chambers (largest city: Valley)
 Choctaw (largest town: Butler)
 Clarke (largest city: Jackson)
 Conecuh (largest city: Evergreen)
 Lee (largest city: Auburn)
 Madison (largest city: Huntsville)
 Mobile (largest city: Mobile)
 Pickens (largest city: Aliceville)
 Talladega (largest city: Talladega)
 Tuscaloosa (largest city: Tuscaloosa)

Notes
Partisan clients and other notes

Voter samples

References

Further reading

External links
 
 
  (State affiliate of the U.S. League of Women Voters)
 

Official campaign websites
 Doug Jones (D) for Senate
 Tommy Tuberville (R) for Senate

2020
Alabama
United States Senate